Pedro Manuel da Cunha Hipólito (born 16 September 1978) is a Portuguese football manager and former player. He was most recently the manager of Næstved Boldklub.

External links 
 
 
 
 Profile at playmakerstats.com

1978 births
Living people
Footballers from Lisbon
Association football midfielders
Portuguese footballers
S.C.U. Torreense players
Associação Académica de Coimbra – O.A.F. players
S.C. Farense players
Amora F.C. players
C.D. Olivais e Moscavide players
Primeira Liga players
Portugal youth international footballers
Expatriate footballers in Iceland
Expatriate men's footballers in Denmark
Portuguese football managers
Úrvalsdeild karla (football) managers
Íþróttabandalag Vestmannaeyja managers
Næstved Boldklub managers